Eli Franklin Burton OBE,  (February 14, 1879 – July 6, 1948) was a Canadian physicist.

Burton was born in Green River, township of Pickering, Ontario, Canada.  He graduated from the University of Toronto in 1901.  From 1904 to 1906 he studied colloids with J. J. Thomson at the Cavendish Laboratory at the University of Cambridge, writing an important monograph on the subject in 1938.  He also wrote a college textbook on physics. He had become the head of the University of Toronto Physics Department in 1932.

Burton developed the first practical electron microscope at the University of Toronto in the late 1930s with the help of university students Cecil Hall, James Hillier, and Albert Prebus. He was made a fellow of the Royal Society of Canada and received the Henry Marshall Tory Medal in 1947. He was a member of the National Research Council of Canada and worked on radar research and training during World War II. Burton died in Toronto in 1948.  There is now an award given in his name by the Electron Microscopy Society of America (https://web.archive.org/web/20110319105103/http://www.microscopy.org/awards/past.cfm#burton).

References 
 Biography from the Royal Society of Canada on the award of the Henry Marshall Tory Medal, (accessed 2005-12-21).

External links
 Eli Franklin Burton at The Canadian Encyclopedia

1879 births
1948 deaths
Canadian physicists
Canadian inventors
University of Toronto alumni
Academic staff of the University of Toronto
Fellows of the Royal Society of Canada
Fellows of the American Physical Society